The 1993 East Carolina Pirates football team was an American football team that represented East Carolina University as an independent during the 1993 NCAA Division I-A football season. In their second season under head coach Steve Logan, the team compiled a 2–9 record.

Schedule

References

East Carolina
East Carolina Pirates football seasons
East Carolina Pirates football